Chief Kanongesha is a Senior Chieftainship of the Kanongesha-Lunda people in the North-Western Province of Zambia, based about  west of the district headquarters, Mwinilunga. Kanongesha is one of three Lunda Senior Chieftainships in Zambia. The current Chief serves under the mantle Mulumbi Datuuma II.

The annual Chisemwa cha Lunda ceremony held by the chief draws crowds to the district every September.

References

Traditional rulers in Zambia
Living people
Year of birth missing (living people)